Dimitris Kaklamanakis (Greek: Δημήτρης Κακλαμανάκης; born 1 September 1994) is a Greek professional basketball player for PAOK Thessaloniki of the Greek Basket League. He is a 2.06 m tall center.

Professional career 
Kaklamanakis played in amateur leagues with Milonas before starting his pro career with Peristeri.

In 2015, he signed with Lavrio. During his first season with Lavrio, he was a role player, averaging only 4 minutes per game. On 2 July 2016, Kaklamanakis renewed his contract with Lavrio until 2017 and gained a bigger role on the team's squad. At the end of the season, he averaged 4.4 points and 2 rebounds per game. On 10 July 2017, he renewed his contract with Lavrio until 2018.

After four years with Lavrio, on 4 July 2019, Kaklamanakis signed a two-year contract with AEK Athens. On 28 July 2020, he moved to Thessaloniki for PAOK.

On 5 August 2021, Kaklamanakis returned to Lavrio. In 23 league games, he averaged 9.3 points, 5.3 rebounds, 1 assist and 0.7 blocks, playing around 22 minutes per contest.

On 21 July 2022, Kaklamanakis signed with Promitheas Patras, following his Lavrio teammate Vassilis Mouratos. On January 13, 2023, he returned to PAOK for the rest of the season.

National team career 
Kaklamanakis became a member of the senior men's Greek national basketball team in 2019. He played at the 2019 FIBA World Cup qualification.

Career statistics

Domestic Leagues

Regular season 

|-
| 2018–19
| style="text-align:left;"| Lavrio
| align=center | GBL
| 26 || 23.3 || .503 || - || .580 || 5.5 || .9 || .6 || .6 || 8.3
|}

References

External links 
Eurobasket.com Profile
RealGM.com Profile

1994 births
Living people
AEK B.C. players
Centers (basketball)
Greek Basket League players
Greek men's basketball players
Ilysiakos B.C. players
Lavrio B.C. players
Milon B.C. players
P.A.O.K. BC players
Peristeri B.C. players
Promitheas Patras B.C. players
Basketball players from Athens